Bcl-2-associated transcription factor 1 is a Bcl-2 family protein in humans that is encoded by the BCLAF1 gene.

This gene encodes a transcriptional repressor that interacts with several members of the BCL-2 family of proteins. Overexpression of this protein induces apoptosis, which can be suppressed by co-expression of BCL2 proteins. The protein localizes to dot-like structures throughout the nucleus and redistributes to a zone near the nuclear envelope in cells undergoing apoptosis. Multiple transcript variants encoding different protein isoforms have been found for this gene.

References

Further reading

External links